Jesse Stone: Thin Ice is a 2009 American made-for-television crime drama film directed by Robert Harmon and starring Tom Selleck, Kathy Baker, and Kohl Sudduth. Based on the characters from the Jesse Stone book series created by Robert B. Parker, the film is about the police chief of a small New England town who investigates a cryptic letter sent to the mother of a kidnapped child who was declared dead. Filmed on location in Nova Scotia, the story is set in the fictitious town of Paradise, Massachusetts. 

Jesse Stone: Thin Ice is the fifth in a series of nine television films based on the characters of Parker's Jesse Stone novels. The film received an American Society of Cinematographers Award for Outstanding Achievement in Cinematography, as well as a Canadian Society of Cinematographers Award for Best Cinematography in TV Drama for Rene Ohashi.

Plot

Main plot
State Police Captain Healy is attacked but is saved by Jesse, who is able to get off a couple of shots at the unknown assailant despite also being wounded. At the hospital, Healy reveals to Jesse that he was spying on his nephew, who may be sleeping with his saxophone instructor. Jesse begins investigating the shooting despite protests from the Paradise town council. The town council members feel that the police department is already spread too thin, and they and Internal Affairs are concerned about six shooting incidents Jesse has been involved in. They also don’t like that Jesse ran Officer D'Angelo out of the department because he didn’t like him. The town council liked him very much because he wrote three times as many parking tickets as the other officers, and manned the speed trap into the town, bringing in substantial revenue for Paradise. Jesse refuses to have the speed trap manned, because he feels it is unethical, and cuts down the tree that blocks the speed limit sign so the speed trap won’t work anymore.

Meanwhile Jesse continues his regular phone calls with Jenn. She is contemplating moving in with Elliot, and Jesse tells her it would be unethical for her to move in with her producer. She hangs up on him. Jesse also continues his therapy, but Dr. Dix seems to be having trouble himself. He visits Jesse at his office and confesses that he misses being a cop. Seeing that Dix is in need of a friend, Jesse offers to buy him dinner.

Jesse continues to investigate the shooting of Captain Healy despite being told not to. He questions Gino Fish about the shooting, but gets nothing. He also talks to Sister Mary John, who indicates that it may have been linked to underage prostitution, and gives him three names. Once again Jesse contacts Gino Fish, knowing his distaste for prostitution, and without diming the person out directly, Fish indicates to Jesse that he would focus his investigation on the second name Sister Mary John gave him, Teddy Leaf.  Meanwhile Jesse begins sleeping with the Internal Affairs officer who is investigating him, Sidney Greenstreet. He uses his influence with her to get some information on Leaf, and begins following him. When he reveals this to Captain Healy, Healy gets very upset and tells Jesse not to pursue Leaf because he is extremely dangerous. Jesse ignores this and pursues him anyway, threatening Leaf in a bar bathroom. Greenstreet warns Jesse that he had better tread carefully, because she knows how he works: he sets people up. Jesse then gets Leaf to follow him to an apartment with Suitcase's help, and blindsides him. He ties him up in the apartment and anonymously calls the police who then bust him for breaking and entering, and carrying a weapon; both parole violations that get him locked up for a long time. Jesse figures this is better than nothing, since they can’t get him on the shooting.

Subplots
The main subplot of the film concerns the search for a missing child. Elizabeth Blue comes to Chief Stone asking for help investigating the disappearance of her baby boy. The case was widely publicized seven years earlier as the disappearance of "Little Boy Blue." A body was found with the baby’s hospital wrist band, but the mother is convinced it was not her son, and even left her husband over the matter. Her conviction comes from a letter she received two years earlier postmarked Paradise that says "Your child is loved." Jesse feels compassionate towards the grieving mother, but believes the child is probably dead after all these years and that the letter could have been from anyone.

Rose disagrees and begins investigating on her own. Jesse fears investigating a cold case from New Mexico will make things even worse with the town council, but he does not stop her. Rose reaches a dead end after investigating all of the seven-year-old children in the town. But then Suitcase suggests that the person may have left town after writing that letter two years ago and that Rose should be checking school records from two years ago. She does this and is led to Stephanie Morton. They discover that Morton had a baby boy the same time that Baby Blue was born, but that he died at birth. No one knew that the baby died, because Morton went on vacation to New Mexico right after the birth. There she kidnapped Baby Boy Blue and brought him home, passing him off as her own unbeknownst to anyone else. She left her dead baby in the New Mexico desert with the stolen Baby Boy Blue’s hospital wrist band on. Chief Stone, and Rose go to Morton’s house to confront her with what they now know, but they discover that Little Boy Blue died two years earlier in an ice skating incident. He was skating and wandered out onto thin ice, broke through and died. Morton suffered hypothermia trying to rescue him, but was unable to save him. That is when she sent the letter to Baby Boy Blue’s mother. Upon returning to the police station, Jesse finds that he has been suspended without pay pending an investigation. Not wanting Elizabeth to hear the news from the media, Rose and Suitcase agree not to arrest Morton until Jesse can tell Baby Boy Blue's mother personally. The film ends with Jesse traveling to New Mexico to give Elizabeth Blue the news.

Cast

Production

Filming locations
 Halifax, Nova Scotia, Canada

Reception

Awards and nominations
 2010 American Society of Cinematographers Award for Outstanding Achievement in Cinematography (Rene Ohashi)
 2010 Canadian Society of Cinematographers Award for Best Cinematography in TV Drama (Rene Ohashi)

See also
 Jesse Stone (character)

References

External links
 
 
 

2009 television films
2009 films
2009 crime drama films
American crime drama films
American police detective films
CBS network films
Crime television films
Films directed by Robert Harmon
Films scored by Jeff Beal
Films set in Massachusetts
Films shot in Nova Scotia
Murder in television
American drama television films
2000s English-language films
2000s American films